Ali Awad Bujaloof (Arabic:علي عوض بو جلوف) (born 27 April 1995) is a Qatari footballer. He currently plays for Al-Shamal.

External links

References

Qatari footballers
1995 births
Living people
Qatar SC players
Al-Wakrah SC players
Al-Shamal SC players
Qatar Stars League players
Qatari Second Division players
Association football wingers